Eeva Jalavisto (until 1934 Elmgren; 21 March 1909 – 12 June 1966) was a Finnish Professor of physiology and an influential researcher and policy maker in the areas of health and social care of the elderly as well as wider gerontology.

Early life and education
Born in Kerimäki to Chief Physician Dr  and Ines  Meurman, Eeva Elmgren completed her secondary education at the Helsingin Suomalainen Yhteiskoulu, graduating in 1927.

She then followed her father into medicine, graduating from University of Helsinki medical school as early as in 1931, and going on to obtain her Licentiate as well as Doctorate in medicine and surgery in 1937.

Career
Jalavisto worked at the University of Helsinki Institute of Physiology from 1933, reaching the rank of Docent in 1941, and that of Professor in 1947.

She was a board member of the Finnish Medical Society, Duodecim, from 1947 to 1950.

She was also active in physiology and gerontology associations, serving as a co-founder, secretary and later chair of the Finnish Society of Gerontology (Societas Gerontologica Fennica), board member of the International Association of Gerontology and Geriatrics, and member of the Nordic Gerontology Association.

She undertook research visits to Sweden, Germany, the United Kingdom and the US from the late 1930s to the early 1950s.

Together with her fellow physiologist , she named erythropoietin (also known as EPO).

Death
Eeva Jalavisto died following a protracted illness, aged 57.

References

Finnish physiologists
Gerontologists
University of Helsinki alumni
Academic staff of the University of Helsinki
1909 births
1966 deaths
People from Kerimäki